Sunday Lake is an unorganized territory located in Saint Louis County, Minnesota, United States. As of the 2000 census, its population was zero.

Geography
According to the United States Census Bureau, the unorganized territory has a total area of 26.5 square miles (68.7 km2); 21.5 square miles (55.6 km2) is land and 5.1 square miles (13.2 km2) is water. The total area is 19.19% water.

Populated places in St. Louis County, Minnesota
Unorganized territories in Minnesota